The 1997 UAB Blazers football team represented the University of Alabama at Birmingham (UAB) in the 1997 NCAA Division I-A football season, and was the seventh team fielded by the school. The team's head coach was Watson Brown, who entered his third season as the UAB's head coach. They played their home games at Legion Field in Birmingham, Alabama and competed as a Division I-A Independent. The Blazers finished their second season at the I-A level with a record of 5–6.

Schedule

References

UAB
UAB Blazers football seasons
UAB Blazers football